Geruma may be,

Geruma Island, Japan
Geruma language, Nigeria